Jaime Gonçalves (born 6 February 1899, date of death unknown) was a Portuguese footballer who played as a forward. He was born in Lisbon.

External links 
 
 

1899 births
Year of death missing
Portuguese footballers
Association football forwards
Sporting CP footballers
Portugal international footballers
Footballers from Lisbon